The Wall was the third season of the Greek reality television series Big Brother. The show followed eighteen contestants, known as housemates, who were isolated from the outside world for an extended period of time in a custom-built house. 

In 2003, Big Brother Greece 3 launched under the name The Wall on ANT1 on March 10 and ended on June 30, last 113 days. This season introduced the notion of "The Battle," in which the house is separated into a luxurious half and a poor half, with two teams of housemates constantly fighting for time in the luxurious half. Each week, one or more of the housemates were evicted by a public vote. The last remaining housemate, Thodores Jspógloy, was declared the winner, winning a cash prize of €300,000.

The show presented by Andreas Mikroutsikos. Expectations for the format proved unsuccessful with ANT1 choosing not to use it again.

Housemates

Nominations Table 
No information about 3 housemates: Debora, Gogo & Sissy.

References

2003 Greek television seasons
03